Bauhinia purpurea is a species of flowering plant in the family Fabaceae, native to the Indian subcontinent and Myanmar, and widely introduced elsewhere in tropical and subtropical areas of the world. Common names include orchid tree, purple bauhinia, camel's foot, butterfly tree, and Hawaiian orchid tree.

Description
The flowers are conspicuous, pink, and fragrant, with five petals. Leaves are alternate.

Cultivation
In the United States of America, the tree grows in Hawaii, coastal California, southern Texas, and southwest Florida. Bauhinia × blakeana is usually propagated by grafting it onto B. purpurea stems.

Uses
The young leaves and flowers of Bauhinia purpurea are edible. In the Philippines, B. purpurea is known as alibangbang (lit. "butterfly"). The leaves have a citrusy and sour taste and are used as a souring agent for sinigang and similar dishes in Philippine cuisine.

Throughout Southeast Asia, B. purpurea and related species are also used in making poultices for treating swelling, bruises, boils, and ulcers. Various parts of the plant are also used in decoctions to treat fever and stomach ailments, as well as being used as an astringent. 

In Indian traditional medicine, the leaves are used to treat coughs while the bark is used for glandular diseases and as an antidote for poisons. The flowers are also used in pickles and curries and is regarded as a laxative. It is called Kānchan ( কাঞ্চন) in Assamese , Odia ‍and in Bengali.

Chemistry
A wide range of chemical compounds have been isolated from Bauhinia purpurea including 5,6-dihydroxy-7-methoxyflavone 6-O-β-D-xylopyranoside, bis [3',4'-dihydroxy-6-methoxy-7,8-furano-5',6'-mono-methylalloxy]-5-C-5-biflavonyl and (4'-hydroxy-7-methyl 3-C-α-L-rhamnopyranosyl)-5-C-5-(4'-hydroxy-7-methyl-3-C-α-D-glucopyranosyl) bioflavonoid, bibenzyls, dibenzoxepins, mixture of phytol fatty esters, lutein, β-sitosterol, isoquercitin and astragalin.

Gallery

References

External links

Phanera purpurea L., Purple camel's foot

purpurea
Flora of the Indian subcontinent
Flora of Myanmar
Garden plants of Asia
Ornamental trees
Fabales of Asia